Among those interred at the Hietaniemi Cemetery in Helsinki.

Artist's Hill 
 Aino Aalto, architect
 Alvar Aalto, architect
 Elissa Aalto, architect
 Tapani Aartomaa, graphic artist
 Erik Bergman, composer
 Juhana Blomstedt, painter
 Rut Bryk, designer
 Walentin Chorell, author
 Ella Eronen, actor
 Mauri Favén, painter
 Akseli Gallen-Kallela, painter
 George de Godzinsky, conductor
 Maggie Gripenberg, dancer
 Walton Grönroos, opera singer
 Heimo Haitto, violinist
 Tauno Hannikainen, conductor
 Juhani Harri, sculptor
 Eva Hemming, dancer
 Eila Hiltunen, sculptor
 Martha Hirn, opera singer
 Carl Hirn, composer
 Tea Ista, actor
 Yrjö Jyrinkoski, reader
 Pentti Kaskipuro, designer
 Aimo Kanerva, painter
 Åke Lindman, film director and actor
 Paavo Liski, theater director
 Reko Lundán, playwright
 Tarmo Manni, actor
 Usko Meriläinen, composer
 Timo Mikkilä, pianist
 Onni Okkonen, art historian
 Selim Palmgren, composer
 Spede Pasanen, artist
 Otso Pietinen, photographer
 Lasse Pihlajamaa, accordionist
 Marjatta Pokela, singer
 Martti Pokela, singer
 Sakari Puurunen, theater director
 Essi Renvall, sculptor
 Paavo Rintala, author
 Olli-Matti Ronimus, poet
 Sylva Rossi, actor
 Timo Sarpaneva, designer
 Solveig von Schoultz, author
 J. S. Sirén, architect
 Minna Talvik-Palmgren, singer
 Aimo Tukiainen, sculptor
 Bruno Tuukkanen, painter
 Veikko Tyrväinen, opera singer
 Leif Wager, actor
 Mika Waltari, author
 Elina Vaara, poet
 Jorma Weneskoski, jazz musician
 Edward Vesala, jazz musician
 Usko Viitanen, opera singer
 Tapio Wirkkala, designer
 Heikki W. Virolainen, sculptor
 Jack Witikka, film director
 Eeva-Kaarina Volanen, actor

Old part 
 Ida Aalberg, actor
 August Ahlqvist, linguist
 , supercentenarian
 Vivica Bandler, theater director
 Kaarlo Bergbom,  theater director
 Henrik Borgström, politician
 A. K. Cajander, prime minister
 Paavo Cajander, poet
 Fredrik Cygnaeus, national awakener
 J. R. Danielson-Kalmari, historian
 Albert Edelfelt, painter
 Johan Albrecht Ehrenström, public planner
 Carl Ludvig Engel, architect
 Carl Enckell, diplomat
 Eero Erkko, newspaper publisher
 Eljas Erkko, newspaper publisher
 Pentti Fagerholm, radio reporter
 Erik von Frenckell, mayor
 Hannes Gebhard,  co-operative leader
 Martti Haavio, academician
 Aale Tynni, poet
 Aaro Hellaakoski, poet
 Jyrki Hämäläinen, journalist
 Theodor Höijer, architect
 Viktor Jansson, sculptor
 Tove Jansson, painter, author and illustrator
 Risto Jarva, film supervisor
 Robert Kajanus, conductor
 Aino Kallas, author
 Siimes Kanervio, journalist, translator
 Aurora Karamzin, philanthropist
 Uuno Klami, composer
 Yrjö Sakari Yrjö-Koskinen, fennoman
 Pekka Kuusi, director general
 Aarre Lauha, bishop
 Curt Lincoln, race car driver
 Leevi Madetoja, composer
 Urho Muroma, revivalist movement leader
 L. Onerva, poet
 Sophie Mannerheim, nurse
 Leo Mechelin, statesman
 Edvard Engelbert Neovius, mathematician and topographer
 Frithiof Nevanlinna, mathematician
 Harri Nevanlinna,  doctor
 Otto Nevanlinna, mathematician
 Rolf Nevanlinna, mathematician
 Saara Nevanlinna, philologist
 Johan Mauritz Nordenstam, senator
 Jyrki Otila, quiz show host
 Fredrik Pacius, composer
 Lauri Posti, professor
 Armas J. Pulla, author
 Anders Edward Ramsay, General
 Georg Edvard Ramsay, General
 Alpo Sailo, sculptor
 Helene Schjerfbeck, painter
 Hugo Simberg, painter
 J. V. Snellman, statesman
 Fabian Steinheil, General Governor
 Robert Stigell, sculptor
 Niilo Tarvajärvi, radio and TV journalist
 Erik Tawaststjerna, music critic
 Maria Hanna Kujanen, Psychiatrist
 Clas Thunberg, speed skater
 Herbert Tillander, goldsmith
 Zachris Topelius, author
 Ralf Törngren, politician
 Rudolf Walden, General
 Georg August Wallin, explorer
 Martin Wegelius, composer
 Voitto Viro, vicar
 Väinö Voionmaa, historian
 Magnus von Wright, painter
 Herbert Tillander, gemologist

New part 
 Heikki Aaltoila, composer
 Esa Adrian, translator
 Sinikka Arteva, TV journalist
 Anni Collan, educator
 Carl-Erik Creutz, radio announcer
 Uno Cygnaeus, pedagogue
 J. H. Erkko, poet
 Karl-August Fagerholm, prime minister
 Karl Fazer, manufacturer
 Eelis Gulin, bishop
 Ilmari Hannikainen, composer
 Jussi Himanka, correspondent
 Veikko Hursti, philanthropist
 Lauri Ingman, archbishop
 Tuure Junnila, politician
 Elmo Kaila, independence
 Inkeri Kajava, author
 Viljo Kajava, author
 Ahti Karjalainen, politician
 Sylvi Kekkonen, author
 Heikki Klemetti, choirmaster
 Rudolf Koivu, illustrator and painter
 Hannes Konno, composer
 Birgit Kronström, actor and singer
 Toivo Kuula, composer
 Toivo Kärki, composer
 Edvin Laine, film supervisor
 Hanna Lappalainen, pharmacist
 Eino Leino, poet
 Axel Lille, party leader
 Aarre Merikanto, composer
 Oskar Merikanto, composer
 Ukri Merikanto, sculptor
 Algot Niska, smuggler
 Kasimir Pennanen, actor
 Kaisu Puuska-Joki, radio announcer
 Markus Rautio, "Markus-setä"
 Joel Rinne, actor
 Eino Ripatti, Mannerheim Cross Knight
 Heikki Ritavuori, Minister of the Interior
 Walter Runeberg, sculptor
 Yrjö Ruutu, social influence
 Hannes Ryömä, politician
 Mauri Ryömä, politician
 Eetu Salin, labour movement leader
 Ville-Veikko Salminen, actor
 E. N. Setälä, professor
 Aarne Sihvo, General
 Martti Simojoki, archbishop
 Elvi Sinervo, poet
 Bobi Sivén, activist
 Emil Skog, politician
 Arto Sotavalta, popular song
 Einari Teräsvirta, architect, olympic winner
 Robert Tigerstedt,  professor of physiology
 Esko Toivonen, artiste "Eemeli"
 Petri Walli, Kingston Wall-band singer-guitarist and songwriter
 Martti Välikangas, architect
 Kaapo Wirtanen, painter
 Pia Hattara, actor
 Pentti Irjala, actor
 Martti Katajisto, actor
 Kosti Klemelä, actor
 Aku Korhonen, actor
 Uuno Laakso, actor
 Kaisu Leppänen, actor
 Risto Mäkelä, actor
 Jalmari Rinne, actor
 Unto Salminen, actor
 Heikki Savolainen, actor
 Jussi Snellman, actor
 Ruth Snellman, actor
 Rauli Tuomi, actor
 Yrjö Tuominen, actor
 Kyllikki Väre, actor

Hietaniemi area 
 Siiri Angerkoski, actor
 Teuvo Aura,  Mayor
 Kim Borg, opera singer
 Adolf Ehrnrooth, General
 Hilding Ekelund, architect
 Saulo Haarla, actor
 Antti Hackzell, governor
 Harri Holkeri, Councillor of state
 Eero Järnefelt, painter
 Uuno Kailas, poet
 Kyösti Karhila, aviator
 Erkki Karu, film supervisor and producer
 Juhani Kirpilä, doctor, collector of art
 Toivo Kivimäki, prime minister
 Kauko Käyhkö, singer, actor
 Risto Leskinen, attorney general
 Gunnar Lihr, commercial pilot
 Keijo Liinamaa, National conciliator
 Edwin Linkomies, Chancellor of the University
 Armand Lohikoski, film supervisor
 Lauri Malmberg, soldier
 Eugen Malmstén, composer and singer
 Georg Malmstén, composer and conductor
 Ragni Malmstén, singer
 Otto Manninen, poet
 Erkki Melartin, composer
 Anna Mutanen, opera singer
 Ernst Nevanlinna, professor
 Matti Paasivuori, trade unionist
 Simo Puupponen (Aapeli), author, columnist
 Jukka Rangell, prime minister
 Juha Rihtniemi, party leader
 Ilmari Salomies, archbishop
 Kaarlo Sarkia, poet
 Antti Satuli, ambassador
 Artur Sirk, Estonian freedom fighter
 Aili Somersalmi, actor
 Urho Somersalmi, actor
 Kalevi Sorsa, prime minister
 Anni Swan, author
 Toivo Särkkä, film producer and supervisor
 Väinö Tanner, party leader
 Alexander Tunzelman von Adlerflug, soldier
 Sakari Tuomioja, diplomat
 Maiju Lassila (aka Algot Untola), author
 Edvard Valpas-Hänninen, journalist
 Juho Vennola, prime minister
 Juha Virkkunen,  journalist
 Paavo Virkkunen, politician
 A. I. Virtanen, nobelist
 Hella Wuolijoki, author
 Arvo Ylppö, archiater

Presidents
 Urho Kekkonen
 Carl Gustaf Emil Mannerheim
 Juho Kusti Paasikivi
 Lauri Kristian Relander
 Risto Ryti
 K. J. Ståhlberg
 Mauno Koivisto

Crematorium 
 Eero Antikainen, trade unionist
 Pietari Autti,  General, Mannerheim Cross Knight
 Paavo Berglund, conductor
 Jarl Fahler, parapsychology, hypnotist
 Nils-Eric Fougstedt, conductor
 Ilpo Hakasalo, radio music journalist
 Tony Halme, boxer
 Toini Havu, literary critic
 Heinz Hofmann, choirmaster
 Cisse Häkkinen, musician
 Anja Ignatius, violinist
 Bengt Johansson, composer
 Martti Jukola, radiojournalist
 Eino Jurkka, actor, supervisor, theater director
 Emmi Jurkka, actor, theater director
 Jussi Jurkka, actor
 Matti Jämsä, journalist
 Heino Kaski, composer
 Yrjö Kilpeläinen, journalist and columnist ("Jahvetti")
 Esko Kivikoski, quiz master
 Juhani Kumpulainen actor, supervisor
 Arvo Kuusla actor
 Irja Kuusla actor
 Esko Linnavalli, musician
 Erkki Melakoski, composer, musicjournalist
 Nils Mustelin, professor
 Eero Mäkelä, chef
 Juhani Mäkelä, journalist, author
 Masa Niemi, actor
 Valo Nihtilä, colonel
 Esko Nikkilä, Internal Medicine professor
 Assi Nortia, actor
 Jorma Nortimo, film supervisor
 Jorma Ojaharju, author
 Olavi Paavolainen, author
 Sauvo Puhtila, "Saukki ja Pikkuoravat"
 L. A. Puntila, historian, politician
 Väinö Purje, chef
 Matti Ranin, actor, Theatre Counsellor
 Saara Ranin, actor
 Sulho Ranta, composer
 Leo Riuttu, actor
 Aarno Ruusuvuori, architect
 Orvo Saarikivi, film supervisor
 Tauno Sarantola, dean
 Arto Satukangas, pianist
 Jukka Sipilä, actor, supervisor
 Harri Sirola, author
 Teija Sopanen, TV announcer
 Teppo J. Suonperä, colonel, quiz master
 Penna Tervo, minister
 Raimo Utriainen, sculptor
 Juha Vainio, singer and songwriter
 Sulo Wuolijoki, politician, author
 Kalle Österlund, doctor
 Hertta Kuusinen, minister

Cemetery of the Finnish Guard 
 Aleksei Apostol, conductor
 Holger Fransman, professor, horn artist
 Adolf Leander, conductor
 Lenni Linnala, conductor
 Armas-Eino Martola, General, The Mannerheim Cross Knight
 Martti Parantainen, conductor
 Albert Puroma, General, The Mannerheim Cross Knight
 Artturi Rope, conductor
 Wäinö Sola, oopperasinger
 Ville-Poju Somerkari, General
 Mika Tiivola,  banker
 Arvi Kalsta, General, politician
 Väinö Valve, General

Notes

External links
 List 
 
 

 
Hietaniemi Cemetery